Ananelus (also known as Hanameel) was a Jewish High priest in the 1st century BCE.

Though of priestly descent, he was not a member of the Hasmonean dynasty. The Mishnah (Parah 3:5) identifies him as Hanameel the Egyptian, while Josephus ("Ant." xv. 2, § 4) identifies him as being from Babylon.

He was appointed by Herod to fill the office of high priest made vacant by the death of Antigonus (37 BCE).  Ananelus's incumbency was of short duration. Prudence compelled Herod to remove him, and to fill his place with the Hasmonean Aristobulus (36 BCE). The youthful Hasmonean, however, was too popular with the patriotic party; though he was a brother of Mariamne, Herod's beloved wife, he was treacherously drowned at Herod's instigation (35 BCE), and Ananelus was restored to the high position. How long he continued in office historians do not state; but it could not have been for many years, since after the execution of Mariamne (29 BCE) Herod remarried, and appointed his second father-in-law, Simon ben Boethus, to the high-priesthood, removing Joshua ben Fabus.

Ananelus is credited with having prepared the last of seven total "red heifers" (see Numbers 19) which were provided in all the centuries from Ezra's restoration to the final dispersion of the Jews (Parah 3:5).

References

Jewish Encyclopedia: Hanameel the Egyptian

1st-century BCE High Priests of Israel